Israel competed at the 2022 Winter Paralympics in Beijing, China which took place between 4–13 March 2022. It was the first time Israel competed at the Winter Paralympics.

Administration

Former Paralympic swimmer Inbal Pezaro served as Chef de Mission.

Competitors
The following is the list of number of competitors participating at the Games per sport/discipline.

Alpine skiing

Sheina Vaspi competed in alpine skiing at the 2022 Winter Paralympics. She was not able to compete in the women's slalom standing event after a change in schedule caused a conflict with Shabbat.

See also
Israel at the Paralympics
Israel at the 2022 Winter Olympics

References

Nations at the 2022 Winter Paralympics
2022
Winter Paralympics